The Church of St. Luke is a Roman Catholic parish church under the authority of the Roman Catholic Archdiocese of New York, located at 623 East 138th Street, The Bronx, New York City.

Parish history
The parish was established in 1897 with a Catholic population of around 200, separated from the parish of St. Jerome’s Church (Bronx, New York). The first mass was celebrated by the Rev. John J. Boyle on July 4, 1897, in a barn belonging to the Sadlier family.

Buildings
Archbishop Corrigan dedicated a temporary church February 27, 1898. “The stone basement church was completed at a cost of $45,000, including the lot. Father Boyle next built a rectory of pressed brick, and then devoted his efforts to providing a school.

The school building was opened in 1909, having cost $80,000. It is of brick with stone trimmings.”  The school was staffed by the Dominican Sisters of Blauvelt, who originally lived on the third floor of the school.

Pastors
 Rev. John Boyle (1897-1914),
 Very Rev. Msgr. Daniel J. McMackin, D.D., Ph.D. (1916-1922),
 Rt. Rev. John J. Mitty, D.D. (1922-1926),
 Rev. Patrick J. Minogue (1926-1931),
 Rt. Rev. Msgr. Robert B. Mulcahey, DD (1931-1966), Rev. Miguel Juan, T.O.R. 1960
 Rev. Msgr. Gerald J. Ryan (1966-2013)

References 

Religious organizations established in 1897
Roman Catholic churches in the Bronx
Roman Catholic churches completed in 1898
19th-century Roman Catholic church buildings in the United States
1897 establishments in New York City